APTV is an abbreviation with multiple meanings, including

 Associated Press Television News
 American Public Television, also abbreviated APT
 Aptiv, the auto parts company, based on its ticker symbol.